Andargachew Messai (25 March 1902 – 16 August 1981) was an Ethiopian diplomat and the husband of Princess Tenagnework Haile Selassie of Ethiopia, the eldest child of Emperor Haile Selassie and Empress Menen Asfaw. He was born in the Shewa historical region.

Messai died following a long illness in London, United Kingdom. He is buried at Kensal Green Cemetery.

References 

1902 births
1981 deaths
Ethiopian diplomats
Burials at Kensal Green Cemetery
Grand Crosses 1st class of the Order of Merit of the Federal Republic of Germany